Dale Frank (born 1959 in Singleton, New South Wales) is an Australian contemporary artist best known for his biomorphic abstract paintings. His practice has included found object-sculptures, performance installations, drawings and most recently paintings with sculptural elements. Frank lives and works in the Hunter Valley, New South Wales, Australia.

Early life 
Frank was born in Singleton, in the Hunter Valley, New South Wales, Australia. At the age of 19 he moved overseas to pursue a career as an artist in Europe and the United States. In 1998 he returned to live in Australia permanently.

Work 
Frank's artistic explorations in the mid 70s consisted of abstracted landscapes and assemblages that contained materials such as hardwoods and furniture. Later his performance based sculptures included: staging an elaborate lighting and sound disco together with a DJ at Roslyn Oxley9 Gallery, Sydney, and the Canberra Contemporary Art Centre; and installing eight large professional pool tables and associated paraphernalia of a Pool Hall, at the Institute of Modern Art, Brisbane. At the Hotel Art Fair in 1996 Frank was given a luxury suite, where he installed hired four transgender "hostess’s" to serve Swiss Chocolates and Champagne throughout the Fair with the room sculpture becoming the focal point of the Fair. Other sculptures include having himself hypnotised before attending an empty exhibition opening with certain code words prompting certain responses from the artist.

Sculpture installations include in 1994, at the Australian National Gallery, in Canberra, installing high performance miniature speakers, that played out across the entry forecourt a continuous repeat of 5 David Bowie albums, Diamond Dogs, Pin Ups, Aladin Sain, Hunky Dory, Ziggy Stardust, creating the feeling of a daytime disco for those approaching. Another sculpture, at Roslyn Oxley9 Gallery, 1996, consisted of the gallery strewn with filled ash trays and all the detritus of a wild party, as if it had been held the night before.

From 1981 - 1994 Frank created surreal large-scale drawings. Composed of intense tightly held lines they were up to 320 x 720 cm in size. They were exhibited worldwide, including New York (Willard Gallery), Amsterdam (Museum Stedelijk Fodor) and the Art Gallery of New South Wales (Sydney Biennale 1982).

Around 1995 Frank employed varnish as the sole material of his paintings and developed signature his 'monochromes'. Although not the main development of his work at the time, this practice by 2002 saw the introduction of colour and the rapid experimentation of chemical, time and motion studies within the paintings. This distinct technique of layering thick varnish to create abstract hypnotic paintings, resulted in compositions that hint at the psychedelic, and are notable for their vibrant and distinctive use of colour. Although the foundation of this process is not unique to Frank, he has developed and refined his technique over his 35-year career to create a personal sensibility and aesthetic. Australian curator and writer Stuart Koop wrote: 'Since 2001 I'd suggest, Frank's paintings don't depict, or represent anything. Rather in a scientific sense they illustrate the behaviour of different painting materials, in isolation or in combination with others'.

The titles of his paintings are phrases invented or overheard that 'read like short stories' such as To Cool To Matter, and His Common Law ex wife moved to Port Fairy and Went on the Game, adding ambiguity and psychology to the works. Koop writes: 'The works' titles remind us of Frank's creative intercession in these chemical exchanges: snippets from life conversations, things read, influences at large, big and little ideas that might suggest a subject, but perhaps better reflect the life of the artist in parallel - forming a montage whose doubtful inherent logic might still truly reflect the chaotic complexity of influence.'

Australian art critic Andrew Frost stated: 'Dale Frank's work is out there, all on its own, largely untroubled by recent theory or passing fashion. It stands alone, majestic and strange.' However, his current works in particular ascribe to the 'expanded notion' theory of painting: sculpture, and performance could be considered in as part of the painting medium. Frank's 2015 exhibition at Neon Parc, Melbourne demonstrated this. The show included found objects turned sculpture such as Bust, a white chocolate fountain, whose abject nature and painterly chocolate flow correlated with the accompanying paintings

Dale has shifted from working on canvas to Perspex in his current practice, which he states has added a new dimension to the work both 'spatially and conceptually'. The reflective nature of Perspex alters the paint quality, and in addition the work becomes a 'performance' activated and completed when the viewer stands before it.

In 2014 Dale Frank donated 85 works valued at $4 million AUD to the National Gallery of Canberra, which they stated was the most significant gift by a living artist since Arthur Boyd Gift in 1975. Gallery director Ron Radford described Franks as 'one of Australia's most important painters'.

Exhibitions 
Frank's exhibition history comprises Australian and international exhibitions. It includes inclusion in the Venice Biennale, in the Aperto section in 1984 and in the collateral exhibition Personal Structures in 2013. In 2010 he participated in the 17th Biennale of Sydney: The Beauty of Distance, Songs of Survival in a Precarious Age.

Solo museum exhibitions include a survey show in 2000 at the Museum of Contemporary Art Sydney, Dale Frank: Ecstasy – 20 Years of Painting. He has held numerous exhibitions at commercial galleries including Roslyn Oxley9, Anna Schwartz, Gow Langsford and Neon Parc.

A monograph So Far: the Art of Dale Frank 2005-1980 (Schwartz Publishing) was published in 2007 and follows the publication of his earlier monograph Dale Frank (Craftsman House, 1992).

Recognition 
Frank was awarded the 2005 Arthur Guy Memorial Painting Prize from the Bendigo Art Gallery, worth $50,000.

Bibliography 
For a complete bibliography refer to Roslyn Oxley9

References

External links
 Dale Frank - Neon Parc 
 Dale Frank - Pearl Lam Galleries 
 Dale Frank - Rosyln Oxley9
 Dale Frank - Gow Langsford  
 Dale Frank - Ocula

Australian painters
Australian contemporary artists
1959 births
Living people
People from New South Wales